Tong Tana is a 1989 Swedish documentary film about the Penan people of Sarawak, Borneo, a federal state of Malaysia, and their struggle to protect their natural environment, the Tropical rainforest of the low and hilly parts of the island and the global support they get through Swiss citizen Bruno Manser. It was made by Björn Cederberg and Kristian Petri and stars Alec Baldwin as narrator.

External links

1989 films
Swedish documentary films
1989 documentary films
1980s Swedish films